Stefany Micaela Suárez Silva (born 13 August 1994) is a Uruguayan footballer who plays as a midfielder for CA Peñarol and the Uruguay women's national team.

References 

1994 births
Living people
Women's association football midfielders
Uruguayan women's footballers
Footballers from Montevideo
Uruguay women's international footballers
C.A. Bella Vista players
Colón F.C. players
Peñarol players